Luis and the Aliens is a 2018 English-language computer-animated science-fiction comedy film written and directed by Christoph and Wolfgang Lauenstein, and co-directed by Sean McCormack. The film premiered at the Luxembourg City Film Festival on 2 March 2018 and was released in Germany on 24 May 2018, North America on 17 August, and the UK on 24 August 2018.

Plot 
On his 12th birthday, Luis has no friends, and his father, the ufologist Armin Sontag, constantly does not have enough time for him. He does not even know that those whom he is so eager to find are right in front of his nose. On his birthday, Louis becomes the only witness to the crash landing of three aliens near their home. They have a special ability - eat people hair to transform into anything they want. Louis had never had more fun than being around them. But he quickly realizes that if his father finds out about his secret, it will not end well. He decides to help them fix their mothership and fly away with them to the Winters' house.

Marlon later takes the family's SUV. As the rest of his family returns from his younger sister's play, Armin Sontag walks in and tries to force them to assume the guise of aliens. But after the words of their neighbor, Armin Sontag, Mr. Winters and Ms. Dickindecker) set off in pursuit in a courier van.

On the way, Luis reveals the truth to Marlan - in fact, the aliens are traveling with them with Marlon, from which he almost broke the sack. After arriving at Dragon Peak, the aliens and Luis prepare to take off back to her mothership that hovers over the peak. Soon the others arrive there. At the last moment, Ms. Dickindecker takes away Armin Sontag's homemade freezer gun, as Luis tries to stop her but falls off a cliff. The ster and prepares to shoot Luis, but is stopped by Agent Stu who is an member of the Intergalactic Police that was disguised as a ice cream man. Suddenly, Dickindecker transforms into a large dinosaur-like creature called Tontonian. Luis emerges from under the pushed stone. He runs away from the Tontonian, who falls off a cliff. Luis negotiates a plan with Wabo, Nag and Mog. In the course of a difficult duel in which the three aliens pretend to be Luis, gradually leading the Tontonian to the real Luis, who is quickly frozen by him. After that, Stu later sends Dickindecker to his cooling house, and the aliens take the "NubbiDubbi" rug ordered by them and they go back to their mothership.

Voice cast 
Callum Maloney as Luis Sonntag
Dermot Magennis as Armin Sonntag and Wabo 
Ian Coppinger as Mog
Paul Tylak as Nag, Mr. Winter, Ice Cream Man and Bill 
Lucy Carolan as Jennifer Yeng
Eoin Daly as Marlon Winter
Aileen Mythen as Mrs. Winter, Valentina and Ms. Diekendaker
Simon Toal as the principal

Release 
The film had its premiere at the Luxembourg City Film Festival on 2 March 2018, and premiered in Germany at the Stuttgart Festival of Animated Film on 27 April. It was released in cinemas in Germany on 24 May, the US and Canada on 17 August and the UK on 24 August. The film grossed $12,632,840 worldwide.

The film received generally negative reviews from critics. On review aggregator Rotten Tomatoes, the film holds an approval rating of 24% from 17 reviews, and on Metacritic it has a score of 46 out of 100 based on 4 reviews, indicating "Mixed or average reviews."

References

External links 

Luis and the Aliens at Kinderfilmwelt.de – German children's films database

Animated feature films
2018 films
2010s children's adventure films
German children's films
German computer-animated films
Danish animated films
Danish independent films
Luxembourgian animated films
3D animated films
Animated films about extraterrestrial life
20th Century Fox films
Warner Bros. films